Westbourne Grammar School is an Australian independent and non-denominational Christian co-educational day school in Truganina, an outer south-western suburb of Melbourne, Victoria. Westbourne has two campuses. The larger campus, opened in 1978, is located on Sayers Road in Truganina and offers classes for students at all levels, kindergarten to the Victorian Certificate of Education (VCE). A smaller campus is situated in nearby Williamstown and provides education for students up to and including Year 4. There is also a childcare centre at the Truganina campus.

The total enrolment is approximately 2200 students, with 1200 at secondary level (Years 7 to 12). Most students come from suburbs in the west of Melbourne, from Werribee and Hoppers Crossing, to Newport and Williamstown, to Sydenham and St Albans, to Footscray and Maribyrnong. The school has a specially designed facility dedicated for international students and a comprehensive English as a Second Language program. It hosts many international students each year. The school has in excess of 150 teachers, support staff and office workers. The principal of Westbourne is Adrian Camm. He has held the position since 2022 and is the fourth principal of the Truganina campus after John Pascoe, Geoffrey Ryan and Meg Hansen.

In 2017 the school celebrated its 150th anniversary. Throughout the year the school hosted many events to celebrate its sesquicentenary year, including a school fete and marking the beginning for the construction of the swimming pool. The sesquicentenary year also included rebranding of the school logo.

House system
The house system impacts most of school life. Each house has its own locker pod and office. Four major inter-house events (swimming, athletics, cross-country and singing) form the main part of this competition. A shield is awarded to the house with the most points based on their performance throughout the year in these major events as well as other minor events such as badminton, chess, monologue and debating.

Houses
Senior school houses with house mascots and colours:
 Derrimut House ("Derrimut Tigers") - orange
 Flinders House ("Flinders Falcons") - blue
 Hudson House ("Hudson Dragons") - green
 Molland House ("Molland Bulls") - red 
 Pascoe House ("Pascoe Pythons") - yellow/gold
 Strathmore House   ("Strathmore Sharks") - purple

The Westbourne Grammar School Junior School houses are for Years 3 to 6. The inter-house sports that the junior school include three major carnival events (swimming, athletics and cross-country running) form the main part of this competition. A trophy is awarded to the house with the most points over the course of the year.

Junior school houses with colours:
 Gerity House (blue) 
 Miller House (green)
 Price House (red)
 Steedman House (white)

Sport and games
Westbourne participates in the Association of Co-Educational Schools (ACS) in the senior school, where they play in weekly sport as well as carnivals (swimming, athletics, cross country, public speaking, chess and girls' football).

ACS premierships 
Westbourne has won the following ACS premierships.

Combined:

 Badminton (14) - 2001, 2002, 2005, 2006, 2007, 2010, 2011, 2013, 2014, 2015, 2016, 2017, 2018, 2019
 Touch Football (3) - 2009, 2019, 2020

Boys:

 Basketball (2) - 1999, 2018
 Cricket (4) - 2001, 2010, 2013, 2018
 Football (5) - 2010, 2011, 2017, 2018, 2019
 Futsal (3) - 2014, 2017, 2020
 Hockey (7) - 1999, 2001, 2012, 2013, 2014, 2015, 2017
 Soccer (11) - 1998, 1999, 2000, 2001, 2002, 2004, 2007, 2008, 2010, 2011, 2016
 Softball (8) - 1999, 2001, 2002, 2003, 2009, 2016, 2018, 2019
 Table Tennis (10) - 2008, 2009, 2010, 2011, 2012, 2013, 2016, 2017, 2018, 2019
 Tennis (15) - 1999, 2000, 2001, 2005, 2007, 2008, 2009, 2010, 2011, 2012, 2013, 2014, 2016, 2017, 2018
 Volleyball (9) - 1998, 1999, 2000, 2001, 2005, 2007, 2008, 2009, 2012

Girls:

 Basketball - 2014
 Futsal - 2018
 Hockey (4) - 1999, 2005, 2009, 2010
 Netball (2) - 1998, 2000
 Soccer (6) - 2001, 2005, 2009, 2010, 2011, 2015
 Softball (8) - 1998, 1999, 2000, 2001, 2006, 2011, 2012, 2020
 Table Tennis (22) - 1998, 1999, 2000, 2001, 2002, 2003, 2004, 2005, 2006, 2007, 2008, 2009, 2010, 2011, 2012, 2013, 2014, 2015, 2016, 2017, 2018, 2019
 Tennis (12) - 1998, 1999, 2001, 2002, 2004, 2006, 2007, 2009, 2010, 2011, 2012, 2013
 Volleyball (5) - 2007, 2011, 2015, 2016, 2019

Senior sports (10-12)

Summer
Cricket (boys)
Futsal (boys)
Hockey (boys)
Netball (girls)
Soccer (girls)
Softball (girls and boys)
Table Tennis (boys)
Tennis (girls)
Touch Rugby (mixed)
Volleyball (girls)

Winter
Australian Rules Football (boys)
Australian Rules Football (girls)
Badminton (mixed)
Basketball (girls)
Beach Volleyball (mixed)
Futsal (girls)
Hockey (girls)
Netball (girls)
Soccer (boys)
Softball (boys)
Table Tennis (girls)
Tennis (boys)
Volleyball (boys)

Junior sports (7-9)

Summer
Softball (girls)
Basketball (boys)
Cricket (boys)
Hockey (boys)
Soccer (girls)
Softball (boys)
Table Tennis (boys)
Tennis (girls)
Volleyball (girls)

Winter
Australian Rules Football

Junior school sports (5-6)
In the junior school, Westbourne participate in the Coeducational Independent Primary Schools Sports Association (CIPPSA), with weekly sport matches. All teams also have the opportunity to participate in the summer and winter lightning premierships. They also compete in the South Yarra District Schools Association where they compete against other schools in carnivals such as swimming, athletics and cross country and can progress to the Beachside Division and onto regionals and state level.

Sport teams are mixed gendered and play through the summer and winter seasons some sports include football, soccer, futsal, handball, sofcrosse, softball, hockey, table tennis, tennis, netball and cricket.

Notable alumni
Bella Paige - runner up of the Voice Kids Australia 2014, Australian entrant to Junior Eurovision 2015 and runner up of The Voice Australia 2018
 James Jeggo - Adelaide United footballer
 Lydia Lassila - Winter Olympics gold medal winner
 Shannon Corcoran - AFL footballer
 Anton de Pasquale - V8 Supercar Driver

See also 
 List of schools in Victoria
 List of high schools in Victoria
 Victorian Certificate of Education

References

External links
 Westbourne Grammar School website

Private primary schools in Melbourne
Private secondary schools in Melbourne
Member schools of the Headmasters' and Headmistresses' Conference
Nondenominational Christian schools in Melbourne
Junior School Heads Association of Australia Member Schools
Schools in Wyndham